Reverse brain drain is a form of brain drain where human capital moves in reverse from a more developed country to a less developed country that is developing rapidly. These migrants may accumulate savings, also known as remittances, and develop skills overseas that can be used in their home country.

Brain drain can occur when scientists, engineers, or other intellectual elites migrate to a more developed country to learn in its universities, perform research, or gain working experience in areas where education and employment opportunities are limited in their home country. These professionals then return to their home country after several years of experience to start a related business, teach in a university, or work for a multi-national in their home country. Their return is this "Reverse Brain Drain".

The occurrence of reverse brain drain mostly depends on the state of the country's development, and also strategies and planning over a long period of time to reverse the migration. Countries that are attractive to returning intelligentsia will naturally develop migration policies to attract foreign academics, professionals and executives. This would also require these countries to develop an environment which will provide rewarding opportunities for those who have attained the knowledge and skills from overseas.

In the past, many of the immigrants from developing countries chose to work and live permanently in developed countries; however, the recent economic growth that has been occurring back in their home countries—and the difficulty of attaining long-term work visas—has caused many of the immigrants to return home.

Definition
The term ‘reverse brain drain' is closely tied with brain drain and brain gain because reverse brain drain is a migratory phenomenon that results due to the brain drain of the intellectual elites from developing countries and is the mirror image of the benefit of an inflow of high quality human resources which is brain gain.

Reverse brain drain is sometimes related to the term ‘brain circulation', which is when migrants return to their own country on a regular or occasional basis, sharing the benefits of the skills and resources they have acquired while living and working abroad. An example of the benefits for the host countries, especially developing countries, are the payments of remittances. This provides a reason for governments to issue new legislation and tax rules that encourage outward migration and remittances.

However, "brain circulation" is known as the extended definition of brain gain with an emphasis on human capital circulation across nations in the global market, benefiting both the sending and receiving nations; in addition it is considered a two-way flow of skill, capital, and technology, unlike brain drain and reverse brain drain.

Another form
Recently there is a different type of reverse brain drain developing. This form of reverse brain drain differs from the way it is commonly viewed. It is explained by Salman Khurshid, the former Minister of State for Corporate and Minority Affairs in India. He states that "Many second-generation Indians are coming back to the country". Therefore, reverse brain drain is no longer limited to the commonly perceived migration from a developed to a developing country by a first generation individual. Many of the world's top multinational companies are beginning to send their top Indian minds to head their companies in India and have the idea of reverse brain drain which is, "So when we lose some, we win many back."

Enhancing reverse brain drain
The countries where reverse brain drain occurs are developing countries, or are countries who have suffered a significant impact from the 'brain drain' from developed countries. Governments have attempted to reverse the flow of brain drain through implementing new contracts, scholarships, government policies, and several other methods. Three methods of implementing and enhancing reverse brain drain are through governments retaining their students, encouraging students to pursue tertiary studies abroad and promoting them to return, and engaging with the diasporas which will encourage expatriates to remit savings, act as bridges for foreign investment and trade, and facilitate the transfer of skills and knowledge. There are several countries that are prime examples of these three methods—and several other methods—which are:

Asia

China
China has generally been seen as a developing country, and they have been impacted by brain drain through the migration of their talented minds to the developed world. 
What has assisted China in the flow of return migration are central government policies. These policies are changes in the domestic environment, the freedom to immigrate and emigrate freely, political stability, and changes in how the government uses people. In addition, the local government was involved in the enhancement of return migration by cities rewarding the returnees with large bonuses from their home unit. There are also other reasons which encouraged the migration back to the home country, which were higher social status in China, better career opportunities in China, and patriotism.

In addition, competition among universities, research laboratories and enterprises has given the returning intellectual elites excellent incentives. For example, in the new life science school at Beijing's Tsinghua University, they were able to recruit many Chinese scientists who were previously in more developed countries like the United States due to China's booming economy, large government investment in research, and the chance to build a science program from the ground up.

Besides the government policies and economic reasons for returning to China, certain family factors influenced the decision to return, some of the reasons where parental views about returning, concerns for children, and the attitude of one's spouse about returning.

India
India is one of the first countries where the phenomenon of reverse brain drain occurred. Previously, India was well known for being the country where numerous information technology students left for America for a better education and greater employment opportunities. The turning point was during the dot-com bubble. During this period many information technology experts were forced to return to India due to the slump and the loss of jobs in the United States.

Previously, the Indian Government was unhappy of the occurrence of brain drain. Tens of thousands of migrants who had initially come to the U.S. for graduate engineering education, accepted jobs in Silicon Valley rather than return to their home countries, where professional opportunities were limited.

Besides the dot-com bubble crisis, the economic and employment opportunities that existed back home; interested many Indian entrepreneurs to improve the economic development in the home country, which increased the number of returning intelligentsias to India.

In addition, other reasons for the returning migration of the Indian high-skill workers was due to their desires to return to their roots, a more family-oriented lifestyle, and also security concerns in the post-9/11 period where Indians were discriminated against because they were often mistaken for Arabs.

Although many have returned, more have stayed.  The Seattle Times estimates that 25% of all software developers in the US either are, or once were H1B's, and Silicon Valley is now at a whopping 75% for the same statistic.  This translates to more than two million Indians in Software Development, who are now permanent residents of the US along with their spouses and children, as 90% of H1B's were Indian.

In a 2018 article The Seattle Times estimates that half of the software developers in Seattle are born overseas.  This situation repeats itself in many cities across the nation. Although there are claims of a shortage as the reason for the H1Bs, the total number of software developers in the US has remained fairly flat, growing at an average rate of only two to four percent, and many suspect that this brain drain is championed by the US's government as an intentional brain drain from India to the US.

Nepal
The Government of Nepal's Ministry of Foreign Affairs opened a Brain Gain Center in May 2019, with the explicit purposes of identifying successful Nepali diaspora experts and professionals around the world, promoting their expertise within the government, facilitating the connections between government officials and them.

Pakistan
In wake of the September 11 attacks and the financial crisis of 2007–2010, a large number of expatriates forming the Pakistani diaspora throughout North America, and even Europe, began to return to Pakistan. Many of these returning expatriates tended to have excellent credentials and due to their professional and cultural background were able to easily assimilate and find new job opportunities in the country – contributing to an overall "reverse brain drain" effect. One notable example is the media boom in Pakistan which inspired and prompted many overseas Pakistanis working in the field of journalism to return to the country and take up readily available positions in the country's largest press groups and channels. Today, there are over 47,000 British nationals in Pakistan, many of whom are of Pakistani origin, who have returned to contribute to the economic development of the country.

South Korea
South Korea's reverse brain drain was different from the social phenomenon because it was based on an organized government effort with various policies and the political support of President Park Chung Hee. The main features of Korea's Reverse Brain Drain policies were the creation of a conducive domestic environment, and the empowerment of returnees.

Besides the policies, there are also cultural incentives for the intellectual elites to return home which was the desire to improve Korea's economic conditions and competitiveness, the cultural differences between Korea and America, and family-related responsibilities and concerns. Many of the students who migrated to the United States to study, especially the only son or the eldest of the family, felt obligated to return home to be with the family

Taiwan
Previously, Taiwan had experienced a loss of more than 80 percent of its students who had completed their graduate study in the United States, but the government of the Republic of China (ROC) responded to this to increase the return migration of the students.  Some of the action taken by the authorities of the Republic of China were the setting up of the National Youth Commission (NYC), a cabinet-level government office, and other organizations to recruit Taiwan's scholars abroad and carry out related programs. In addition, Taiwan's official policy consists of two sections:

 Improve and strengthen the institutions of higher learning at home
 Encourage Taiwan's "brain" in the United States to remigrate and/or contribute their talents and knowledge to Taiwan's national development.

One reason behind the increased percentage of college students going abroad and the decline of returnees was due to Taiwan's political status and the severed diplomatic ties with the ROC government in 1979; however, the percentages of college students study abroad slowly started to increase after the political shock settle.
The two most cited reasons for returning to Taiwan in 1983 were highly normative pride and strong identification with Taiwan's developmental goal and desire to be in it. Besides these reasons, there were other social and cultural reasons that were given by the returning migrants which were:

 Never thought of staying in the U.S.
 I have wife and children in Taiwan
 My parents wanted me to come home
 I was offered an ideal job in Taiwan
 I could not find an ideal spouse in the U.S.
 I was discriminated against in the U.S.
 I could not find a good job in the U.S.

Latin America

Mexico
The federal government of Mexico has been implementing public policies, were included in the Program for the Support of Science and Research, which were designed to internationalize the domestic academic market and had the objective to repatriate young Mexican scientists who have obtained a postgraduate degree abroad.

The result of the repatriation and retention of Mexican researchers from 1991 to 1996 and 2002 shows how there is a general increase of more Mexican researchers to return to Mexico and this can be viewed in the table below:

^ Previously known as Repatriation and Retention

Although these policies have been assisting in the slow returning migration of young Mexican scientists, the policies should be broadened out and not focused exclusively on individual scientists, due to the positive outcomes that may result from repatriation.

Africa
In Africa, instead of the commonly termed ‘brain drain', the term ‘reverse transfer of technology' (RTT)  is used to describe the migration of scientists from developing countries to overseas. 
In order to prevent the loss of the experts, Africa has observed the "friends and relatives effect", which identifies professional, societal and personal factors as the three imperatives underlying the decision of African students in the United States to return home. In addition, the most widespread instrument used by African countries to combat the brain drain is bonding, which obligates a graduate to return home for a required period of time before s/he can emigrate or to also have bilateral agreements with developed countries, which will require them to return home immediately upon graduation. These approaches are influenced from the policies that exist and worked in Asian countries.

Associated problems
The problem of a reverse brain drain is exacerbated by anxiety in developed countries.  This is of particular concern in the United States of America, where not enough undergraduate students are seeking advanced degrees at the doctorate level. This leads to several consequences. Initially, it increases the widespread replacement of native-born with foreign born professionals and academics in the areas of greatest intellectual and economic interest to the developed country. This is a problem since foreign-born professional and academics from developing countries, such as China or India, are increasingly motivated to return to their home countries due to rapid economic growth, increasing living standards, and increasing opportunities in their home country. The reverse migration of the foreign-born professionals and academics leaves developed countries with a lack of intellectual capital. This may lead to economic drawbacks in developed countries and diminishing opportunities for native-born professionals. Statistics show that more than 52% of Silicon Valley's startups during the recent tech boom were started by foreign-born entrepreneurs. In addition, the "foreign-national researchers have contributed to more than 25% of our global patents… foreign-born workers comprise almost a quarter of all the U.S. science and engineering workforce and 47% of science and engineering workers who have PhDs."  Furthermore, 54% of engineering doctorates went to foreign students, who returned to their home country after graduation, which disheartens the executives of research and development in the developed countries.

See also
 International students
 Student migration

References

External links
The reverse brain drain – by Doug Sanders
NASA scientists want jobs with ISRO after Chandrayaan

Demographic economics
Employment of foreign-born
Foreign workers
Human migration
Brain drain
Cultural globalization